Majagua may refer to:

 Hampea reynae, a flowering plant species in the family Malvaceae endemic to El Salvador
 Majagua, Cuba, a municipality in Ciego de Ávila Province, Cuba